Benjamin Williams (born 25 January 1992) is a British male triple jumper, who won an individual gold medal at the 2009 World Youth Championships.

Career
At the end of 2012 Ben won a scholarship to the University of Louisville in January 2013.

As a result of a knee injury, he has missed out on the London 2012 Olympic Games, the Rio 2016 Olympics, and the 2018 Commonwealth Games.

His personal best jump is 17.14m. He achieved this at the European Athletics Team Championships in Bydgoszcz, Poland on 11 August 2019, securing qualification for the World Championships in Doha, in September 2019, and for the 2020 Summer Olympics in Tokyo. His previous best was 16.74 metres, achieved in June 2015 in Eugene. He almost managed to equal that when jumping 16.73 metres at the 2017 European Team Championships Super League, finishing second.

References

External links
 
 
 
 
 
 

1992 births
Living people
British male triple jumpers
English male triple jumpers
British Athletics Championships winners
World Youth Championships in Athletics winners
Olympic athletes of Great Britain
Athletes (track and field) at the 2020 Summer Olympics